Pik Skalisty is the highest peak in the Shughnon Range, Pamir.

It is located in the Gorno-Badakhshan Autonomous Province of Tajikistan.

See also
List of mountains of Tajikistan

References

Mountains of Tajikistan
Gorno-Badakhshan Autonomous Region
Five-thousanders